Arlindo Cruz (born September 14, 1958, birth name Arlindo Domingos da Cruz Filho) is a Brazilian musician and songwriter, working in the genre of samba and pagode. Arlindo took part in the most important formation of Grupo Fundo de Quintal, and is considered one of the most important figures of the pagode movement.

Biography

At the age of seven, Arlindo was given his first musical instrument, the cavaquinho, by his father (Arlindão), a friend and partner of Candeia with whom he had founded the Mensageiros do Samba group. From 7 to 12 years, Arlindo already played by ear, learning chord voicing from his brother Acyr Marques' guitar playing. At 12, he went on to study classical guitar for 2 years at Flor do Méier institution. About that time he started working professionally as a musician, on rodas de samba with various artists, especially Candeia who he considers to be his musical godfather. With Candeia he recorded a simple compact and an LP called `Roda de Samba', playing cavaquinho.

With Jorge Aragão exiting Grupo Fundo de Quintal, Arlindo was invited to join the group, invitation which he accepted happily, dedicating himself during 12 years of success. Arlindo played the banjo cavaquinho in the group and was one of the lead voices and songwriters, along with singer/songwriter Sombrinha, who played cavaquinho and guitar.

Arlindo Cruz has over 450 songs recorded by various artists, including Zeca Pagodinho, Maria Rita and Beth Carvalho. Arlindo is also considered one of the most prolific banjo players to have ever dwelled in the samba scene, alongside Almir Guineto, with a great number of studio recordings for various artists, standing as a distinguished instrumentalist.

After leaving Grupo Fundo de Quintal in 1993, Arlindo released one solo record. Soon afterwards, he joined his old partner Sombrinha in a quite successful partnership, Arlindo Cruz & Sombrinha, which lasted until ca. 2005.

In 2012, Arlindo Cruz recorded 'Tatu Bom De Bola' the official song for Fuleco the Armadillo the official Mascot of FIFA 2014 World Cup scheduled to take place in Brazil from 12 June to 13 July 2014.

In 2015, his album Herança Popular was nominated for the 16th Latin Grammy Awards in the Best Samba/Pagode Album category.

Arlindo Cruz proceeded in solo career until March 17, 2017 when he suffered a stroke. It occurred when the musician was preparing himself to travel with his son to Osasco, São Paulo, as part of the project "Pagode 2 Arlindos". In the following year, he regained the movements of his mouth and is able to breathe by himself since 2019.

References

 Arlindo Cruz at Só Samba

Samba musicians
Living people
Brazilian Candomblés
1958 births
Samba enredo composers
Latin music composers